Dahlhaus is a German surname. Notable people with the surname include:

 Carl Dahlhaus (1928–1989), German musicologist
 Jasper Dahlhaus (born 2001), Dutch footballer
 Luke Dahlhaus (born 1992), Australian rules footballer

German-language surnames